Wonder is the fourth studio album by Canadian singer Shawn Mendes. It was released by Island Records on December 4, 2020. Its production was handled by Mendes, Frank Dukes, Kid Harpoon and Scott Harris, among others. The album was preceded by Shawn Mendes: In Wonder, a 2020 Netflix documentary capturing Mendes' off-stage life.

Upon release, Wonder received generally favourable reviews from music critics, most of whom noted Mendes' vocal improvements, but were polarized over the album's production and songwriting, deeming them predictable and formulaic. Wonder debuted at number one in Canada and the United States. Three singles supported the album: "Wonder", "Monster" with Justin Bieber, and "Call My Friends", with the former two reaching the top 20 of the US Billboard Hot 100. The album's lead single, "Wonder," peaked at number 18 on the Hot 100, and reached the top ten in several other countries. The second single, "Monster," reached number eight on the US Hot 100 and topped the Canadian Hot 100. To promote the album, Mendes embarked on the Wonder World Tour, which commenced in June 2022 in Portland and was set to conclude in August 2023 in Dublin, before Mendes prematurely ended the tour in July 2022 due to mental health issues.

Background and promotion
In August 2020, Shawn Mendes got the word "wonder" tattooed on his right arm, which would later turn out to be the title of the album and its lead single. On September 30, 2020, the singer took to his social media to tease towards the project with the caption "WHAT IS #WONDER". Hours later, he went on to announce the title and release dates of both lead single and album, as well as release the interlude "Intro", the first track on the album. The album pre-orders were released to streaming services on September 30.

In a statement, Mendes said of Wonder: "It really feels like a piece of me has been written down on paper and recorded into song. I tried to be as real and as honest as I've ever been. It's a world and a journey and a dream and an album I've been wanting to make for a really long time. I absolutely love it. Thank you for being by my side for so many years. I love you all so much."

To promote the album, a feature-length documentary titled Shawn Mendes: In Wonder directed by Grant Singer was released on Netflix on November 23, 2020, chronicling the past few years of Mendes' life, including his rise to fame, his 2019 self-titled world tour and the making of Wonder. Mendes executive produces the film, which was honored as a special selection at the 2020 Toronto International Film Festival.

Mendes revealed the album's tracklist through a Spotify canvas that was updated daily starting November 2, 2020. On November 13, Mendes revealed the tracklist on social media.

Singles
"Wonder" was released as the title track and lead single from the album on October 2, 2020. Teasers for both the song and accompanying music video were released alongside the announcement. "Monster", a collaboration with fellow Canadian singer Justin Bieber, was released as the second single on November 20. "Call My Friends" was released as the third single alongside the album release on December 4.

Critical reception

At Metacritic, which assigns a normalized rating out of 100 to reviews from mainstream critics, the album has an average score of 65 out of 100, which indicates "generally favorable reviews" based on 9 reviews.

Rolling Stone writer Jon Dolan defined Wonder as a compelling mixture of "youthful passion" and "coming-of-age agony", characterized its production as "grandiose" with backing choirs and dramatic drums, with sentimental lyrics inspired heavily by Camila Cabello. Vulture's Craig Jenkins found the album predictable, but praised Mendes for improving his vocals. He described it as a "headphone album, full of intriguing tones, lush textures, and unexpected twists", with "short and sweet" songs that lack the energy of his 2016 hit singles "Treat You Better" and "Mercy". Quinn Moreland of Pitchfork felt the album was "naive—and vaguely terrifying" while opining "it’s nice to see his cup overflow so bountifully, but the near-constant awe quickly grows tiresome." He also noted that Wonder is Mendes' "most musically adventurous album" but that "every song is plagued by the same problem: Production that attempts to compensate for lyrical blandness by forcibly inserting drama." He ended his review by saying that Mendes "has yet to make a statement that truly sets him apart."

Dubbing Mendes as the North American version of Ed Sheeran, The Guardian critic Alexis Petridis was favourable towards Mendes's vocal performance and the "important" teenage themes discussed on Wonder, such as anxiety and toxic masculinity, but thought that it is deficit of personality, criticizing the "least appealing" production, and formulaic ballads with "ponderous-verse-into-epic-chorus" structure. Leah Greenblatt, writing for Entertainment Weekly, asserted that the album sees Mendes "still discovering himself in real time", feeling free, expressing sexual tension and reflecting on early fame, and picked "Call My Friends", "Dream" and "Song for No One" as the best tracks. In a less favourable review, Helen Brown of The Independent wrote that Wonder chronicles "the struggles of the lonely touring musician missing his girl", and complimented the album's vintage-inspired sound, but deemed the songs unoriginal. Malvika Padin, writing for Clash, noted that the album is "ambitious" and "stocked full of emotions," but also wrote that it didn't always succeed, at times "feeling too shallow for it to be as impactful as Mendes intended it to be," but called the album worth a listen. Jon Caramanica of The New York Times complimented Mendes' "understanding [of] how to inflate his voice from whimper to peal," but felt that "his lyrics meander and stop short of true sentiment, and his rhythmic deliveries feel less cohesive" and that the record was "much less polished" in comparison to his previous two album releases. Writing for Stereogum, Chris DeVille named Wonder Mendes' "best (or at least most interesting)" album while complimenting his growth as a songwriter, although he feels that at times the record "falls victim to the same overly broad fairytale love-story clichés."

Commercial performance
Wonder debuted at number one on the Canadian Album Chart for Billboard, earning the highest sales and digital song downloads and the second-highest on-demand streams for the week. It became Mendes' fourth Canadian number-one album.

Wonder debuted at number one on the US Billboard 200 with 89,000 album-equivalent units (including 54,000 pure sales), becoming Mendes' fourth consecutive US number-one album. It made Mendes the youngest male artist and second-youngest artist after Britney Spears to top the Billboard 200 with four regular studio albums. It also made him the fourth-youngest artist in history to log four number-one titles on the Billboard 200. The album's tracks earned a total of 46.92 million on-demand streams in its first week. In its second week, the album descended to number 25 on the Billboard 200 dated December 17, 2020, with 28,300 units sold. It sold 30,000 units in the week dated December 24, 2020, on the Billboard 200.

Track listing

Notes
  signifies an additional producer
  signifies an assistant producer

Personnel
Credits adapted from Tidal.

Musicians

 Shawn Mendes – vocals , piano , synthesizer , additional vocals , keyboards , guitar , background vocals , acoustic guitar 
 Nate Mercereau – guitar , horn , synthesizer , drums , bass , percussion , French horn , glockenspiel , Mellotron , string arrangement , violin , background vocals , piano 
 Kid Harpoon – synthesizer , drums , guitar , programming , bass , piano , additional vocals , string arrangement , Wurlitzer organ , background vocals 
 Edie Lehmann Boddicker – choir arrangement , background vocals 
 Clydene Jackson – background vocals 
 Jarrett Johnson – background vocals 
 Nayanna Holley – background vocals 
 Toni Scruggs – background vocals 
 Scott Harris – piano , programming , synthesizer , additional vocals , background vocals 
 Andrew Gertler – additional vocals 
 Connor Brashier – additional vocals , background vocals 
 Josiah Van Dien – additional vocals , background vocals 
 Ziggy Chareton – additional vocals 
 Porter Shields – choir arrangement , background vocals 
 Amber Nicole – background vocals 
 Milla Santana – background vocals 
 Yvette Rovira – background vocals 
 Anderson Paak – drums , percussion 
 Rob Moose – strings 
 John Ryan – guitar , programming , synthesizer 
 Shaina Evoniuk – string arrangement , strings , viola , violin 
 Leroy Horns – saxophone 
 Alyssa Rowatt – background vocals 
 Kaushlesh "Garry" Purohit – background vocals 
 Zubin Thakkar – background vocals , guitar , programming , string arrangement 
 Ricky Reed – drum programming 
 Aaron Sterling – drums 
 Morgan Paros – string arrangement, strings 
 Ben Darwish – piano 
 Dave Haskett – bass 
 Mike Sleath – drums 
 Eddy Ruyter – keyboards , Mellotron 
 Surf Mesa – remixer 
 Jesse McGinty – horn 
 Michael Cordone – horn 
 Patrick Riley – strings , string arrangement 

Technical

 George Seara – mixer , recording engineer , engineer 
 Mark "Spike" Stent – mixer 
 Manny Marroquin – mixer 
 Andrew Thornton – mixer 
 Zubin Thakkar – mixer , recording engineer 
 Randy Merrill – mastering engineer 
 Idania Valencia – mastering engineer 
 Jeremy Hatcher – recording engineer , engineer 
 Scott Harris – recording engineer 
 Frank Dukes – recording engineer 
 Josh Gudwin – recording engineer, vocal producer 
 Shawn Mendes – recording engineer 
 Michael Flaherty – recording engineer 
 Tom Wood – recording engineer 
 Nate Mercereau – recording engineer 
 Pete Min – recording engineer 
 Michael Lehman Boddicker – engineer 
 Brandon Leger – engineer 
 Tyler Murphy – engineer 
 Eddy Ruyter – engineer 
 Robin Florent – mix engineer 
 Chris "TEK" O'Ryan – vocal engineer 
 Mike Gnocato – assistant mixer 
 Matt Wolach – assistant mixer 
 Chris Galland – assistant mixer 
 Jeremie Inhaber – assistant mixer 
 Kaushlesh "Garry" Purohit – assistant recording engineer

Charts

Weekly charts

Year-end charts

Certifications

Release history

See also
 List of 2020 albums
 List of Billboard 200 number-one albums of 2020
 List of number-one albums of 2020 (Canada)

References

2020 albums
Albums produced by Frank Dukes
Albums produced by Ricky Reed
Island Records albums
Shawn Mendes albums